Tapiovaara is a surname. Notable people with the surname include:

Ilmari Tapiovaara (1914–1999), Finnish designer
Keijo Tapiovaara (born 1939), Finnish speed skater
Nyrki Tapiovaara (1911–1940), Finnish film director

Finnish-language surnames